Rick Lantz is a former American football coach.  He served as the interim head football coach at the United States Naval Academy for three games 2001, following the firing of Charlie Weatherbie. He was formerly a widely recognized defensive coordinator in the college football ranks and held high-profile jobs at the University of Virginia and the  University of Louisville. He also served as an assistant coach at the Georgia Institute of Technology, the University of Miami, the University at Buffalo, and Boston University.

Lantz also coached the Berlin Thunder and Rhein Fire of NFL Europe. In three seasons (2004–2006) with the Berlin Thunder, Lantz coached the team to an 18–11–1 regular season record. In addition, the Thunder competed in two World Bowls. Berlin won World Bowl XII, 30–24, over the Frankfurt Galaxy on June 12, 2004, in Gelsenkirchen, Germany. The following year, the Thunder fell in World Bowl XIII, 27–21, to the Amsterdam Admirals on June 11, 2005, in Düsseldorf, Germany. The 2006 Berlin season included a 17–17 tie on the road against the Hamburg Sea Devils on April 1, one of just two ties in the history of NFL Europe.  Lantz took the reins of the Rhein Fire in 2007, the final season of NFL Europe. He coached the team to a 4–6 record.

Head coaching record

College

Professional

References

Year of birth missing (living people)
Living people
Barcelona Dragons coaches
Berlin Thunder coaches
Boston University Terriers football coaches
Buffalo Bulls football coaches
Georgia Tech Yellow Jackets football coaches
Louisville Cardinals football coaches
Miami Hurricanes football coaches
New England Patriots coaches
Notre Dame Fighting Irish football coaches
Omaha Nighthawks coaches
Rhein Fire coaches
Virginia Cavaliers football coaches
High school football coaches in Maine
Sportspeople from New Britain, Connecticut